Pickthall is a surname. Notable people with the surname include:

Colin Pickthall (born 1944), British politician
Hal Pickthall (1896–1965), English cricketer
Marjorie Pickthall (1883–1922), Canadian writer
Marmaduke Pickthall (1875–1936), Western Islamic scholar noted as an English translator of the Qur'an